Spunti e ricerche is an annual peer-reviewed academic journal that covers research in Italian studies. Individual volumes often consist of articles on a broadly defined theme, on a particular writer, or on various subjects. The editors-in-Chief are Raffaele Lampugnani (Monash University), Annamaria Pagliaro (Monash University), Antonio Pagliaro (La Trobe University), and Carolyn James (Monash University). Although other Australian journals pre-dated Spunti e ricerche, such as  the now defunct Altro Polo (1978-1996), Spunti e ricerche is the oldest active academic journal in Australia specifically devoted to Italian studies.

History
Spunti e ricerche was the brain child of a number of tutors from the Italian Department of the University of Melbourne in 1981-1982 and the first volume appeared 1985. It was intended to foster, increase, and diversify Australian research and enquiry into Italian studies, specifically in the fields of Italian literature, politics, linguistics, history, society, cinema, and art, but also had the broad aim to encourage manifestations of the culture by Italians, or about Italians, in Australia.

Abstracting and indexing
Spunti e ricerche is indexed and abstracted in:
 International Bibliography of Book Reviews of Scholarly Literature on the Humanities and Social Sciences
 International Bibliography of Periodical Literature
 MLA International Bibliography

External links
 

Publications established in 1985
European studies journals
Annual journals
Multilingual journals